Kandovan or Kandavan may refer to:
 Kandovan, Meyaneh, East Azerbaijan Province
 Kandovan, Osku, East Azerbaijan Province
 Kandovan, Sarab, East Azerbaijan Province
 Kandovan, Ardabil, Ardabil Province
 Kandovan District, in East Azerbaijan Province
 Kandovan Rural District, in East Azerbaijan Province